Arianna Losano (born 13 June 1994 in Italy) is an Italian curler.

Losano plays in lead position and is left-handed.
Losano plays lead For Diana Gaspari and they qualified for the 2017 World Women's Curling Championship

References

External links
 

1994 births
Living people
Italian female curlers
Curlers at the 2012 Winter Youth Olympics